Stress was a short-lived British neo-psychedelic rock band composed of Wayne Binitie, Ian Mussington and Mitch Amachi Ogugua. They released only one album in 1991 on Reprise/Warner Bros. Records. They are not to be confused with the San Diego rock band Stress and are sometimes credited as Stress UK in the United States. Their album drew numerous favourable comparisons with the likes of Jimi Hendrix and The Beatles, and although not a great commercial success, was described as possessing 'a lot of musical strengths' by AllMusic's Steven McDonald.

In 1997, Binitie and Ogugua  released a second album under the moniker of Inqbator, entitled "Hatched". It featured contributions from Lenny Kravitz, whom they had previously supported on tour.

Album
The eponymously titled Stress album featured the following tracks, all composed by Binitie/Mussington/Ogugua:

 "Indian Summer's Dream" 4:20
 "Flowers in the Rain" 4:16
 "Rosechild" 4:16
 "Innocent World" 3:20
 "Daytime Believer" 5:34
 "Beautiful People" 4:14
 "My Father Once Said" 2:29
 "Together" 3:35
 "Lordy Lord" 4:08
 "Red Sun" 7:35

Additional tracks
 "Leather Trouser Blues" 3:58 - "Beautiful People" B-side
 "Flowers in the Rain" (Blood Pressure mix) 4:53 - by Coldcut
 "Flowers in the Rain" (Blood Pressure instrumental) aka International Blood Pressure mix
 "Flowers in the Rain" (without intro) 3:57
 "Beautiful People" (Beautiful Breakdown mix/edit) 6:00/4:22 - by Matt Budd/Steve Sidelnyk
 "Beautiful People" (Bud Dub mix) 5:55 - by Matt Budd
 "Beautiful People" (Bruce Forest mix/edit) 8:02/5:54
 "Beautiful People" (Underground mix) 7:15

Album personnel
 Wayne Binitie: lead and background vocals, acoustic guitar
 Mitch Amachi Ogugua: bass, acoustic guitar
 Ian Mussington: drums
 Guy Chambers: guitar, keyboards, producer, arranger
 Simon Stewart: guitar, background vocals
 Alex Mungo: keyboards, background vocals
 Jean Perry: guitar
 Steve Byrd: guitar
 Billy McGee: double bass
 Talvin Singh: tabla
 Raf Mizraki: various Turkish instruments
 Harry Morgan: percussion
 'False Harmonies': strings
 Claudia Fontaine: background vocals
 Claudia Sarne: background vocals
 Martyn Taylor: background vocals
 Femi Jiya: engineer, No. 2, 3, 6, 9, 10
 Steve Price: engineer, No. 7
 Peter Jones: engineer, No. 1, 4, 5, 8; mixer No. 2, 3, 5, 8, 9
 Julian Mendelsohn: mixer, No. 1, 5, 6
 Michael Brauer: mixer, No. 2, 4, 8, 10
 Bob Kraushaar: mixer, No. 7

Singles

In 1991, "Rosechild" was released as a third single in the UK, but met with no commercial success.

References

British psychedelic rock music groups